Alice Wang (born 26 August 1964) is a Taiwanese politician who served in the Legislative Yuan from 1996 to 2005.

Early life and career
Alice Wang was born to parents Wang Kun-ho and Kao Li-chun. Both her father Wang Kun-ho and younger brother Wang Po-yu have served on the Taipei City Council.

Alice Wang graduated from Taipei Private Yan Ping High School and attended National Taiwan University, where she advocated for the democratization of Taiwan as a student activist. After earning a bachelor's degree in law, Wang continued her legal education at Cornell University in the United States. She worked as a lawyer and also taught at Tamkang University and National Open University.

Political career
She won a seat on the National Assembly in 1991, taking office the next year at the age of 28. She ran for the Legislative Yuan in 1995, winning reelection twice thereafter in 1998 and 2001. During her 2001 campaign, she expressed clear support for downsizing the legislature, but broke with the Democratic Progressive Party by criticizing the vote allocation scheme in place that year. In 2002, Wang pushed the DPP to nominate Yeh Chu-lan as its candidate for the Taipei mayoralty. Instead, Yeh remained head of the Hakka Affairs Council until 2004.

As a legislator, Wang was noted for her speaking out on mental and public health issues, including tobacco consumption and drunk driving. In 2000, she helped draw attention to conditions at the Lungfatang psychiatric care center in Kaohsiung County.

Personal life
Wang co-founded a legislative group for unmarried female parliamentarians in 2002, but left the group after marrying Wang Tsuo-liang in May 2002. It was reported in 2009 that Wang and her husband were earning money from the collection of recyclables. In January 2010, Alice Wang petitioned the Xindian bench of the Taipei District Court to grant her a restraining order against Wang Tsuo-liang, citing verbal and physical abuse.

References

1964 births
Living people
National Taiwan University alumni
Cornell Law School alumni
Academic staff of Tamkang University
Taiwanese women lawyers
20th-century Taiwanese women politicians
Taipei Members of the Legislative Yuan
Members of the 3rd Legislative Yuan
Members of the 4th Legislative Yuan
Members of the 5th Legislative Yuan
21st-century Taiwanese women politicians